The Domaine de Bordeneuve is a French company, producing premium Armagnac brandy.
The entire range of natural, craft Armagnacs is commercialised by Bordeneuve Châteaux & Collections

Presentation
This family company, owned by the Guasch family, produces high quality Armagnacs such as Château de Bordeneuve or Baron de Sigognac.

Characteristics:
 located on the best cru of the appellation: Bas Armagnac area
 100% dedicated to the Armagnac production
 a part of the cellar is from the 13th century, another one is from the 18th

This domain's vines are Ugni Blanc & Baco varietals; perfect grapes for the local soils of the Bas Armagnac region.

www.chateau-bordeneuve.com

External links
 Eaux-de-vie de France
 Armagnac Baron de Sigognac
 Cognac Gaston de Casteljac
 Calvados Charles de Granville

Armagnac
Distilleries in France